The 32nd Stockholm International Film Festival took place on 10–21 November 2021 in Stockholm, Sweden.

Ukrainian crime drama film Rhino won the Bronze Horse, most prestigious award. Kenneth Branagh's Belfast won the Audience Award.

Juries

Competition
Sahraa Karimi, film director
Ronnie Sandahl, director and screenwriter
Kristina Åberg, journalist and film producer

FIPRESCI Award
Esin Kücüktepepinar, film critic
Rok Govednik, film critic
Hsin Wang, film critic

Documentary
Nathan Grossman, director
Tora Mårtens, director
Malin Hübert, producer

Short Film
Lovisa Sirén, screenwriter and director
Hedda Stiernstedt, actress
Arvin Kananian, actor

Official selection

Competition

American Independents

Discovery

Documentary Competition

Icons

Open Zone

Special Presentation

Twilight Zone

Awards
The following awards were presented during the 32nd edition:
Best Film (Bronze Horse): Rhino by Oleg Sentsov
Best Director: Tatiana Huezo for Prayers for the Stolen
Best First Film: The Hill Where Lionesses Roar by Luàna Bajrami
Best Actor: Serhii Filimonov for Rhino
Best Actress: Ruth Wilson for True Things
Best Script: The Hill Where Lionesses Roar by Luàna Bajrami
Best Cinematography: Tim Curtin for A Chiara
Best Documentary: Sabaya by Hogir Hirori
Best Short Film: The Right Words by Adrian Moyse Dullin
FIPRESCI Award: Petite Maman by Céline Sciamma
Zalando Rising Star Award: Edvin Ryding

Lifetime Achievement Award
Jane Campion

Achievement Awards
Kenneth Branagh
Robin Wright

Visionary Award
Joachim Trier

References

External links
Official website

2021 film festivals
2021 in Swedish cinema
2020s in Stockholm
2021